The Monitors can refer to:

 The Monitors (film), a 1969 satirical science fiction film
 The Monitors (comics), fictional characters created by DC Comics
 The Monitors (American band), a Motown act from the 1960s
 The Monitors (Australian band), an Australian band from the early 1980s

See also
 Monitor (disambiguation)
 The Monitor (disambiguation)
 Monitoring (disambiguation)